The South Finegayan Latte Stone Park is a small public park and archaeological site at 74 Golden Shower Lane in Dededo, Guam.  Located in the United States Navy housing area known as Finegayan, it encompasses the remains of a latte stone house site, which are the only remnants of a once-extensive Chamorro village in the area.  Radiocarbon dating and other evidence place the occupation period at this site at c. 1700, and for only a relatively short period of time (about 100 years).

The site was listed on the National Register of Historic Places in 1975.

See also
National Register of Historic Places listings in Guam

References

Archaeological sites on the National Register of Historic Places in Guam
Protected areas established in 1975
1975 establishments in Guam
Dededo, Guam